Albert James Edmondson, 1st Baron Sandford  (29 June 1887 – 16 May 1959), was a British Conservative Party politician. He was the oldest son of James Edmondson, the north London property developer.

At the 1922 general election, he was elected to the House of Commons as Member of Parliament (MP) for Banbury. He was knighted in the 1934 Birthday Honours by King George V. From 1939 to 1942, he served as a government whip, with the title of Vice-Chamberlain of the Household. He held his parliamentary seat until he stepped down at the 1945 general election. He was elevated to the peerage as Baron Sandford, of Banbury in the County of Oxford on 14 July 1945.

Edmondson was a member of the anti-semite Right Club. He died in Westminster aged 71.

Arms

References

External links 
 

1887 births
1959 deaths
Banbury
Edmondson, James
Conservative Party (UK) hereditary peers
Deputy Lieutenants of Oxfordshire
Ministers in the Churchill wartime government, 1940–1945
People educated at University College School
Edmondson, James
Edmondson, James
Edmondson, James
Edmondson, James
Edmondson, James
Edmondson, James
Edmondson, James
Treasurers of the Household
Ministers in the Churchill caretaker government, 1945
Ministers in the Chamberlain wartime government, 1939–1940
Barons created by George VI
Ministers in the Chamberlain peacetime government, 1937–1939